Xenotilapia melanogenys is a species of cichlid endemic to Lake Tanganyika.  This species can reach a length of  TL.  It can also be found in the aquarium trade.

References

External links
 Photograph

melanogenys
Fish described in 1898
Taxonomy articles created by Polbot